Burke's Peerage Limited is a British genealogical publisher founded in 1826, when the Irish genealogist John Burke began releasing books devoted to the ancestry and heraldry of the peerage, baronetage, knightage and landed gentry of Great Britain and Ireland. His first publication, a Genealogical and Heraldic Dictionary of the Peerage and Baronetage of the United Kingdom, was updated sporadically until 1847, when the company began releasing new editions every year as Burke's Peerage, Baronetage and Knightage (often shortened to just Burke's Peerage).

Other books followed, including Burke's Landed Gentry, Burke's Colonial Gentry, and Burke's General Armory. In addition to the peerage, the Burke's publishing company produced books on royal families of Europe and Latin America, ruling families of Africa and the Middle East, distinguished families of the United States and historical families of Ireland.

History

The firm was established in 1826 by John Burke (1786–1848), progenitor of a dynasty of genealogists and heralds. His son Sir John Bernard Burke (1814–1892) was Ulster King of Arms (1853–1892) and his grandson, Sir Henry Farnham Burke (1859–1930), was Garter Principal King of Arms (1919–1930). After his death, ownership passed through a variety of people.

Apart from the Burke family, editors have included Arthur Charles Fox-Davies, Alfred Trego Butler, Leslie Gilbert Pine, Peter Townend, and Hugh Montgomery-Massingberd.

From 1974 to 1983, Jeremy Norman was chairman of the company, taking the role while Hugh Montgomery-Massingberd was editor. His fellow directors included Patrick, Lord Lichfield, and John Brooke-Little.  Under Norman's chairmanship, new volumes were published on royal families, Irish genealogy, and country houses of the British Isles. In 1984, the Burke's Peerage titles were separated and sold: Burke’s Peerage itself was acquired by Frederik Jan Gustav Floris, Baron van Pallandt, while Burke’s Landed Gentry and other titles were sold to other buyers.

Criticism
In 1877, the Oxford professor Edward Augustus Freeman criticised the accuracy of Burke's and said that it contained pedigrees that were purely mythical – if indeed mythical is not too respectable a name for what must be in many cases the work of deliberate invention [... and] all but invariably false. As a rule, it is not only false, but impossible [...] not merely fictions, but exactly that kind of fiction which is, in its beginning, deliberate and interested falsehood. Oscar Wilde in the play A Woman of No Importance wrote: "You should study the Peerage, Gerald. It is the one book a young man about town should know thoroughly, and it is the best thing in fiction the English have ever done!" In 1901, the historian J. Horace Round wrote of Burke's "old fables" and "grotesquely impossible tales".

More recent editions have been more scrupulously checked and rewritten for accuracy, notably under the chief editorship, from 1949 to 1959, of L. G. Pine and Hugh Massingberd (1971–1983). Pine was particularly sceptical regarding many families' claims to antiquity, saying: "If everybody who claims to have come over with the Conqueror were right, William must have landed with 200,000 men-at-arms instead of about 12,000."

See also 
 Almanach de Gotha
 The Complete Peerage
 Debrett's Peerage & Baronetage
 Social Register
 Carnet Mondain
 International Register of Arms, formerly Burke's Peerage & Gentry International Register of Arms

References

External links
 
 
 Burke's Peerage Foundation website

Online editions
 1st edition – 1826 – Hathitrust
 3rd edition – 1830 – Hathitrust
 4th edition – 1832 – Vol 1 – Hathitrust
 4th edition – 1832 – Vol 2 – Hathitrust
 4th edition – 1832 – Vol 2 – Google Books
 4th edition – corrected to 1833 – Vol 2 – Hathitrust
 5th edition – 1838 – Google Books
 6th edition – 1839 – Hathitrust
 7th edition – 1843 – Vol 2 – Hathitrust
 10th edition – 1848 – Hathitrust
 12th edition – 1850 – Hathitrust
 20th edition – 1858 – Hathitrust
 22nd edition – 1860 – Hathitrust
 23rd edition – 1861 – Hathitrust
 27th edition – 1865 – Google Books
 30th edition – 1868 – Google Books
 30th edition – 1868 – Vol 1 – Hathitrust
 30th edition – 1868 – Vol 2 – Hathitrust
 31st edition – 1869 – Vol 1 – Hathitrust
 31st edition – 1869 – Vol 2 – Hathitrust
 37th edition – 1875 – Vol 2 – Hathitrust
 40th edition – 1878 – Hathitrust
 48th edition – 1886 – University of Dusseldorf
 53rd edition – 1891 – University of Dusseldorf
 76th edition – 1914 (to page 1274) – Archive.org
 77th edition – 1915 – Archive.org

Publications established in 1826
Publishing companies established in 1826
British biographical dictionaries
English society
Scottish society
Welsh society
Family history
Genealogy publications
Literature on heraldry
Series of books
19th-century history books
20th-century history books
21st-century history books
1826 establishments in the United Kingdom
Peerages in the United Kingdom